The Women's 4x100m Freestyle Relay event at the 10th FINA World Aquatics Championships swam 20 July 2003 in Barcelona, Spain. Preliminary heats swam in the morning session, with the top-8 finishers advancing to swim again in the Final that evening.

At the start of the event, the World (WR) and Championship (CR) records were:
WR: 3:36.00 swum by Germany on July 29, 2002 in Berlin, Germany.
CR: 3:37.91 swum by China on September 7, 1994 in Rome, Italy

Results

Final

Preliminaries

References

Swimming at the 2003 World Aquatics Championships
2003 in women's swimming